Edward Scott may refer to:

Sportspeople
Edward Scott (footballer) (1897–?), Scottish footballer
Edward Scott (sportsman) (1918–1995), English rugby union captain and cricketer
Edward Scott (water polo) (born 1988), British water polo goalkeeper
Ted Scott (basketball) (born 1985), American basketball player
Teddy Scott (1929–2012), Scottish footballer and coach

Other
Edward Scott (Australian politician) (1852–1920), doctor and Western Australian politician
Edward G. Scott, former mayor of Paducah and president of the Kentucky Municipal League
Edward J. Scott (born 1944), American soap opera producer
Edward T. Scott (born 1965), Virginia Republican state delegate
Edward Taylor Scott (1883–1932), editor of the Manchester Guardian
Edward W. Scott, American businessman, co-founder of BEA Systems
Sir Edward Scott, 2nd Baronet (1793–1852), English Whig MP
Ted Scott (1916–2004), clergyman of the Anglican Church of Canada
Edward Irvin Scott (1846–1931), founder of Scott Paper Company
Edward Scott (MP for Maidstone) (died 1868), British Member of Parliament for Maidstone
Edward Scott (died 1646) (1578–1646), English politician who sat in the House of Commons from 1626
Edward Bate Scott (1822–1909), colonist of South Australia

See also
Ed Scott (disambiguation)